The District Council of Gumeracha was a local government area of South Australia from 1935 to 1997, seated at Gumeracha.

History
The council was established in 1935 out of the abolished District Council of Talunga, much of the abolished District Council of Para Wirra and southwestern parts of the abolished District Council of Mount Crawford. The council area occupied approximately the southwestern two thirds of the Hundred of Para Wirra and the southwestern two thirds of the Hundred of Talunga.

In 1997 Gumeracha amalgamated with the district councils of Onkaparinga and East Torrens to its south, and the District Council of Stirling, to form the much larger Adelaide Hills Council.

See also
 Hundred of Para Wirra
 Hundred of Talunga

References

Gumeracha, District Council of
1935 establishments in Australia
1997 disestablishments in Australia